The second series of Ex on the Beach, a British television programme, began airing on 27 January 2015 on MTV. The series concluded on 17 March 2015 after 8 episodes. The series was confirmed in July 2014 when it was announced that filming would begin soon. Exes for this series included stars of Geordie Shore Charlotte Crosby and Gary Beadle. 

Rogan O'Connor later returned to the beach during the third series, this time as an ex. Gary and Jess both returned to the fifth "all star" series as main cast, whilst Ashley, Kayleigh and Melissa also returned as exes. Kayleigh also went on to appear in the eighteenth series of Big Brother, but was removed from the house on Day 13 due to threatening behaviour. In 2018, Jess Impiazzi, an ex during this series went onto appear in the twenty-first series of Celebrity Big Brother.

Cast
The official list of cast members was released on 6 January 2015 and includes four single boys; Connor Hunter, Luke Goodfellow, Morgan Evans and Rogan O'Connor, as well as four single girls; Anita Kaushik, Kayleigh Morris, Loren Green and Melissa Reeves. It was also announced that Geordie Shore stars Charlotte Crosby and Gary Beadle would be taking part in the series as exes. Ahead of the launch of the new series, it was confirmed that Series 1 cast member Ashley Cain would be returning for the second series as an ex.

All of the official cast members arrived on the beach during the first episode, but were immediately told that they would be soon joined by their exes. During the first episode of the series, Kayleigh's ex-boyfriend Adam Gabriel arrived to stir things up, and Connor's ex-girlfriend Megan Clark was also introduced wanting to rekindle their romance. Rogan's ex-girlfriend model Jess Impiazzi arrived during the second episode. Jess had previously appeared briefly during an episode of the seventh series of The Only Way Is Essex. After getting together in the house, Anita and Rogan's brief fling ended and they were officially added to each other's ex-list. During the third episode, after a lot of anticipation, Gary Beadle arrived on the beach as Melissa's ex-fling. Anita's ex-boyfriend Joe Chandler turned up on the beach during the fourth episode in an attempt to win her back, whilst Geordie Shores Charlotte Crosby arrived during the fifth coming face-to-face with her ex Gary. Danielle Abbott received a warm welcome from ex-boyfriend Luke when she made her first appearance in the sixth episode, and Ashley Cain returned to the beach during the seventh episode as the ex Emily. Ashley had previously appeared in the first series.Bold' indicates original cast member; all other cast were brought into the series as an ex.

Duration of cast

Table Key
 Key:  = "Cast member" is featured in this episode
 Key:  = "Cast member" arrives on the beach
 Key:  = "Cast member" has an ex arrive on the beach
 Key:  = "Cast member" arrives on the beach and has an ex arrive during the same episode
 Key:  = "Cast member" does not feature in this episode

Episodes

Ratings

References

External links
Official website

2015 British television seasons
02